Game of Life (originally known as Oranges) is a 2008 film drama starring Tom Sizemore, Tom Arnold, Heather Locklear and Jill Hennessy. The film was not fully released until 2011, when it was released under the new title Game of Life.

Plot
The film plot follows a children's soccer team which is the common link for a multi-layered story giving a candid look into the intersecting lives of five families living and working in Los Angeles. Oranges examines the complexities of racial and class divisions, and reveals that despite the fragile volatility of human relationships, family is what holds us together and unites us all.

References

External links

Monaco Film Festival
Kent Film Festival

2007 films
2007 drama films
Metro-Goldwyn-Mayer direct-to-video films
Films directed by Joseph Merhi
2000s English-language films